The women's 800 metres at the 2019 World Para Athletics Championships was held in Dubai on 8, 11, and 14 November 2019.

Medalists

Detailed results

T34

T53

T54

References 

2019 in women's athletics
800 metres
800 metres at the World Para Athletics Championships